Big Machine may refer to:
 Big Machine Records, an American record label, a flagship property of the Big Machine Label Group
 "Big Machine" (Goo Goo Dolls song), a song by the Goo Goo Dolls
 "Big Machine" (Velvet Revolver song), a song by Velvet Revolver
 Big Machine (album), a 2003 album by B'z
 The Big Machine, a 2009 album by Émilie Simon
 BigMachines a software company, now part of Oracle
 Big Machine, a 2009 novel by Victor LaValle